Daniel Almaral Mendoza (born February 15, 1983, in Guadalajara, Jalisco) is a Mexican football manager and former player.

External links

1983 births
Living people
Mexican footballers
Mexican football managers
Atlas F.C. footballers
Liga MX players
Ascenso MX players
Footballers from Guadalajara, Jalisco
Association footballers not categorized by position